Karolina Wydra (born March 5, 1981) is a Polish-American actress and model. She played Dominika Petrova on the Fox medical drama series House, and vampire Violet Mazurski on the HBO dark fantasy series True Blood. Wydra has starred in the fantasy thriller After (2012), and the science fiction film Europa Report (2013). She portrayed Detective Dianne Kubek on ABC's short-lived crime drama series Wicked City and recurred as Izel in Agents of S.H.I.E.L.D.

Early life and education
Wydra was born in Opole, Poland with a rare left eye coloboma birth defect in which the iris of the eye does not grow closed during gestation.

Her mother and father were teachers of mathematics and art, respectively. In 1992, she and her family emigrated to Orange County, California, where her parents set up a cleaning business. Her parents separated in 2012, and her mother subsequently moved back to Poland.

Career
In October 1997, Wydra won the Elite Lee Jeans Model Look Contest, which was hosted by Roshumba Williams and Dorian Gregory. She has since appeared in print advertisements for brands such as Armani Exchange, Levi's Red, Calvin Klein, Smashbox Cosmetics, Dooney & Bourke, Charles David, Urban Decay, John Frieda, and Kenneth Cole. Wydra has also appeared as a model on the cover of the German Elle magazine and Oyster magazine.

In 2006, Wydra starred in a Nespresso commercial with George Clooney. In 2008, she co-starred in the comedy-drama film Be Kind Rewind, directed by Michel Gondry, and the sports drama film Sugar, directed by Anna Boden and Ryan Fleck. She then co-starred in the 2011 romantic comedy film Crazy, Stupid, Love as Jordyn. From 2011 to 2012, she appeared on the seventh and eighth seasons of the Fox medical drama series House, playing the role of Dominika Petrova, an immigrant who marries House in order to obtain a green card. Wydra then had a starring role in the 2012 fantasy thriller After, alongside Steven Strait. The following year, she had a lead role as Katya Petrovna in the science fiction film Europa Report. In March 2013, she was cast in the pilot of NBC's remake of the British drama series Bad Girls.

In 2013, Wydra joined the cast of HBO's fantasy drama series True Blood as Violet Mazurski, a vampire who becomes Jason Stackhouse's girlfriend. In the sixth season, Wydra was a recurring cast member, but was upgraded to the main cast for its seventh and final season. In 2014, Wydra recurred as the character Mara Paxton on the fifth season of FX's drama series Justified, and guest starred as Agent Simone Taylor in an episode of the CBS drama series Scorpion. Wydra then co-starred alongside Aaron Eckhart in the Blumhouse Productions horror film Incarnate (2015), directed by Brad Peyton. In 2015, she joined the cast of ABC's crime drama series Wicked City as Dianne Kubek, a beautiful detective working undercover as a barmaid and drug dealer on the Sunset Strip.

In April 2016, it was announced that Wydra had been cast in the Showtime series revival of Twin Peaks. In August 2016, she joined the Amazon Studios drama series Sneaky Pete in a recurring role.

Personal life
Wydra lives in Los Angeles.

She has one older brother, an accountant, who lives in London.

Filmography

Film

Television

Other credits

Stage

Commercials
 (2006) Nespresso…What Else?

References

External links
 Karolina Wydra at Film Web 
 
 

1981 births
21st-century Polish actresses
American people of Polish descent
Living people
People from Opole
People from Orange County, California
Polish film actresses
Polish television actresses
Polish female models
Polish emigrants to the United States